Akihiko (written: 昭彦, 明彦, 彰彦 or 聡彦) is a masculine Japanese given name. Notable people with the name include:

, Japanese mixed martial artist
, Japanese actor
, Japanese engineer and astronaut
, Japanese actor and voice actor
, Japanese politician
, Japanese racewalker
, Japanese former volleyball player
, Japanese video game developer
, Japanese video game music composer
, Japanese decathlete
, Japanese racing driver
, Japanese baseball manager
, Japanese photographer
, Japanese security guard
, Japanese voice actor
, Japanese bobsledder
, Japanese politician
, Japanese video game artist

Fictional characters 
Akihiko Sanada, a character in the video game Persona 3
Akihiko Usami ("Usagi"), Junjo Romantica
Akihiko Kayaba, a character from  Sword Art Online
Akihiko Kajii, a percussionist from GIVEN

Japanese masculine given names